Arthur Brady is the name of:

Arthur Brady (footballer), Scottish footballer in the 1890s
Arthur Brady (politician) (died 1954), Scottish politician and trade unionist